Sharpe Homestead and Cemetery is a historic home and cemetery located at Defreestville in Rensselaer County, New York.  The house was built about 1740 and is a -story rectangular frame dwelling, 20 feet by 40 feet, topped by a steeply pitched gable roof covered with standing seam metal.  It rests on a low fieldstone foundation.  The family cemetery contains approximately a dozen stones marking the graves of the Sharpe and Barringer families.

It was listed on the National Register of Historic Places in 2005.

References

Houses on the National Register of Historic Places in New York (state)
Houses completed in 1740
Houses in Rensselaer County, New York
National Register of Historic Places in Rensselaer County, New York